Alexander Stanhope (1638 – 20 September 1707) was an English envoy in Madrid between 1690 and 1699.

Early life
He was the youngest son of Philip Stanhope, 1st Earl of Chesterfield by his second wife Anne, daughter of John 'Lusty' Pakington. He was educated at Exeter College, Oxford, graduating in 1654.

He married Catherine Burghill, daughter of Arnold Burghill of Thingehill Parva. They had several children, including:
James Stanhope, 1st Earl Stanhope (b 1674 – 5 February 1721) married 24 February 1713 Lucy Pitt, daughter of Thomas Pitt of Boconnoc
Philip Stanhope, (b. unknown; 28 September 1708) Royal Navy Captain
Edward Stanhope, (b. unknown; 23 December 1711) British Army Colonel
Mary Stanhope (b. abt. 1686 –  30 August 1762) married 12 December 1707) Charles Fane, 1st Viscount Fane

His son James Stanhope, a famous General, is sometimes considered the first Prime Minister of Great Britain between 1717 and 1721.

Career
He was a Gentleman Usher to the Queen. He was an Envoy extraordinary to Spain (1689–1706) and Envoy to the States-General.

He was elected a Fellow of the Royal Society in May 1663.

References 

 Stanhope, Alexander, and Philip Henry Stanhope. Spain Under Charles the Second; Or, Extracts from the Correspondence of the Hon. Alexander Stanhope, British Minister at Madrid. 1690-1699. From the Originals at Chevening. London: J. Murray, 1840. googlebooks.com Accessed 22 November 2007
 Chambers, Ephraim. Chambers's Encyclopædia A Dictionary of Universal Knowledge for the People.  Philadelphia: J.B. Lippincott & Co, 1870. googlebooks Accessed 22 November 2007

1638 births
1707 deaths
Younger sons of earls
Ambassadors of England to Spain
Original Fellows of the Royal Society
Ambassadors of England to the Netherlands
Alexander
17th-century English diplomats